

Day 1 (August 30)
Seeds out:
 Men's Singles:  Fernando González [27],  Lleyton Hewitt [32]
 Schedule of play

Day 2 (August 31)
Seeds out:
 Men's Singles:  Marcos Baghdatis [16],  Ernests Gulbis [24],  Radek Štěpánek [28],  Juan Mónaco [30]
 Women's Singles:  Li Na [8],  Nadia Petrova [17],  Lucie Šafářová [26],  Yaroslava Shvedova [30]
 Men's Doubles:  Lukáš Dlouhý /  Leander Paes [3],  František Čermák /  Michal Mertiňák [6]
 Schedule of play

Day 3 (September 1)
 Schedule of play
Seeds out:
 Men's Singles:  Tomáš Berdych [7],  Andy Roddick [9],  Ivan Ljubičić [15]
 Women's Singles:  Victoria Azarenka [10],  Marion Bartoli [13],  Zheng Jie [21],  Alisa Kleybanova [28],  Tsvetana Pironkova [32]
 Men's Doubles:  Jürgen Melzer /  Philipp Petzschner [7]
 Women's Doubles:  Nuria Llagostera Vives /  María José Martínez Sánchez [3]
 Mixed Doubles:  Vania King /  Horia Tecău [8]

Day 4 (September 2)
 Schedule of play
Seeds out:
 Men's Singles:  Nikolay Davydenko [6],  Marin Čilić [11],  Thomaz Bellucci [26]
 Women's Singles:  Agnieszka Radwańska [9],  Aravane Rezaï [18],  María José Martínez Sánchez [22]
 Men's Doubles:  Julian Knowle /  Andy Ram [8]

Day 5 (September 3)
 Schedule of play
Seeds out:
 Men's Singles:  Philipp Kohlschreiber [29]
 Women's Singles:  Flavia Pennetta [19],  Daniela Hantuchová [24],  Petra Kvitová [27],  Alona Bondarenko [29]
 Men's Doubles:  Julien Benneteau /  Michaël Llodra [11]
 Women's Doubles:  Anabel Medina Garrigues /  Yan Zi [8],  Alisa Kleybanova /  Ekaterina Makarova [11],  Hsieh Su-wei /  Peng Shuai [16]
 Mixed Doubles:  Rennae Stubbs /  Dick Norman [5]

Day 6 (September 4)
 Schedule of play
Seeds out:
 Men's Singles:  Juan Carlos Ferrero [22]
 Women's Singles:  Jelena Janković [4],  Maria Kirilenko [23],  Alexandra Dulgheru [25]
 Men's Doubles:  Mahesh Bhupathi /  Max Mirnyi [4]
 Mixed Doubles:  Katarina Srebotnik /  Nenad Zimonjić [3],  Elena Vesnina /  Andy Ram [6]

Day 7 (September 5)
 Schedule of Play
 Seeds out:
 Men's Singles:  Andy Murray [4],  Nicolás Almagro [14],  John Isner [18],  David Nalbandian [31]
 Women's Singles:  Elena Dementieva [12],  Shahar Pe'er [16],  Anastasia Pavlyuchenkova [20]
 Men's Doubles:  Daniel Nestor /  Nenad Zimonjić [2]
 Women's Doubles:  Maria Kirilenko /  Agnieszka Radwańska [10],  Iveta Benešová /  Barbora Záhlavová-Strýcová [12]

Day 8 (September 6)
 Schedule of Play
 Seeds out:
 Men's Singles:  Jürgen Melzer [13],  Mardy Fish [19],  Albert Montañés [21]
 Women's Singles:  Svetlana Kuznetsova [11],  Maria Sharapova [14],  Yanina Wickmayer [15]
 Men's Doubles:  Robert Lindstedt /  Horia Tecău [13],  Mardy Fish /  Mark Knowles [15]
 Women's Doubles:  Květa Peschke /  Katarina Srebotnik [4],  Monica Niculescu /  Shahar Pe'er [13]
 Mixed Doubles:  Cara Black /  Leander Paes [2],  Lisa Raymond /  Wesley Moodie [7]

Day 9 (September 7)
 Schedule of Play
 Seeds out:
 Men's Singles:  David Ferrer [10],  Feliciano López [23],  Sam Querrey [20]
 Women's Singles:  Francesca Schiavone [6],  Samantha Stosur [5]
 Men's Doubles:  Łukasz Kubot /  Oliver Marach [5],  Mariusz Fyrstenberg /  Marcin Matkowski [9],  Wesley Moodie /  Dick Norman [10],  Simon Aspelin /  Paul Hanley [14]
 Women's Doubles:  Gisela Dulko /  Flavia Pennetta [1],  Elena Vesnina /  Vera Zvonareva [14]

Day 10 (September 8)
 Schedule of Play
 Seeds out:
 Men's Singles:  Robin Söderling [5],  Gaël Monfils [17]
 Women's Singles:  Kaia Kanepi [31]
 Men's Doubles:  Marcel Granollers /  Tommy Robredo [12]
 Women's Doubles:  Lisa Raymond /  Rennae Stubbs [5],  Bethanie Mattek-Sands /  Meghann Shaughnessy [15]
 Mixed Doubles:  Bethanie Mattek-Sands /  Daniel Nestor [4]

Day 11 (September 9)
 Schedule of Play
 Seeds out:
 Men's Singles:  Fernando Verdasco [8],  Stanislas Wawrinka [25]
 Women's Doubles:  Cara Black /  Anastasia Rodionova [9]

Day 12 (September 10)
Seeds out:
 Women's Singles:  Caroline Wozniacki [1],  Venus Williams [3]
 Men's Doubles:  Rohan Bopanna /  Aisam-ul-Haq Qureshi [16]
 Women's Doubles:  Chan Yung-jan /  Zheng Jie [7]
Schedule of Play

Day 13 (September 11)
Seeds out:
 Men's Singles:  Roger Federer [2],  Mikhail Youzhny [12]
 Women's Singles:  Vera Zvonareva [7]
 Schedule of Play

Day 14 (September 12)
Some matches had put off to an additional unscheduled Day 15 due to inclement weather.
Schedule of play

Day 15 (September 13)
Seeds out:
 Men's Singles:  Novak Djokovic [3]
 Women's Doubles:  Liezel Huber /  Nadia Petrova [2]
Schedule of play

References

2010 US Open (tennis)
US Open (tennis) by year – Day-by-day summaries